Alejandro Char Chaljub (born 16 April 1966), commonly known as Alex Char, is a Colombian politician. He served two terms as Mayor of Barranquilla from 2008 to 2011 and 2016 to 2019. A civil engineer and member of the Radical Change Party, he was councilor for the Liberal Party in 1997 and in 2000 ran for the Governorship of the Department of Atlántico. Initial ballot results gave victory to his contender Ventura Díaz Mejía, but after a lengthy and often criticized process, the Administrative Supreme Court of Colombia reviewed the election results and found Char to be rightful winner of the race and allowed him to serve the remaining period of his term in 2003.

In 2007 he was elected Mayor or Barranquilla with 221,625 votes equivalent to 58.38% of the total vote, the biggest margin of votes in the Mayoral election history of Barranquilla, and according to an Invamer/Gallup poll, Char had a 75% approval rating in April 2008, the best ranked mayor of Colombia, a statistic that grew to an 80% approval rating at the end of 2008. In 2015 he was reelected for Mayor of Barranquilla defeating his opponent, ex councilor and independent politician Rafael Sanchez Anillo.

Family
Alejandro comes from a well established and influential, Lebanese Colombian family, he is the son of Fuad Char Abdala, a Liberal former Senator of Colombia and former Minister of Economic Development, and Ambassador of Colombia to Portugal, and his wife Adela Chaljub de Char. His brother, Arturo Char Chaljub was also Senator of Colombia, as is his cousin David Char Navas. His other brother, Antonio Char is actually the president of Junior Barranquilla, the city's foremost football team. He married Katia Nule Marino on August 1999, also of Lebanese descent and a former winner of the Miss Carnival of Barranquilla pageant in 1995. She is the daughter of former Ministry of Mines and Energy and Minister of Communications Guido Alberto Nule Amín, and of Ginger Marino Mendoza, a lawyer and activist. Together they have two children, Alejandro Char Nule and Mariana Char Nule.

Basketball
In 2018, the Titanes de Barranquilla became the city's first professional basketball team in 15 years. Chaljub who was Barranquilla's major at that time stressed that the team would enjoy his full support as it would support the development of the local youth. Chaljub added that the idea of having the professional team in Barranquilla came from him. He said “we studied it, analyzed it, and gave the go-ahead, because after the Central American and Caribbean Games the city was hungry for sports. And furthermore, these venues need important events to keep them running and what better way than to be with a team like Titanes at the Elías Chegwin stadium.”

Controversies
Alejandro Char has been linked with corruption cases, including the bribing of judges, and the purchase of votes for his personal benefit or the benefit of his political allies. The accusations were made by former congresswoman Aída Merlano Rebolledo, herself accused of participating in vote-buying patronage networks in the Caribbean Region (Colombia) and currently held captive in Venezuela.

References

External links
  
 

|-

|-

1966 births
People from Barranquilla
Alejandro
Colombian people of Syrian descent
Living people
Colombian people of Lebanese descent
Georgia Tech alumni
Colombian civil engineers
Governors of Atlántico Department
Mayors of places in Colombia